Jewells known from opening until 4 November 1917 as Jewells Swamp is a closed railway platform on the Belmont railway line in New South Wales, Australia. The station opened on 2 January 1917 and closed on 18 April 1940

References

Disused regional railway stations in New South Wales
Railway stations in Australia opened in 1917
Railway stations closed in 1940